Jake Davison may refer to:

 The drummer for the band Aiden
 The perpetrator of the 2021 Plymouth shooting